Zaharia is an Albanian and Romanian variant form of the given name or surname Zechariah/Zacharias.

Notable people with this surname
Zaharia family, an Albanian noble family
Koja Zaharia
Lekë Zaharia
Elia Zaharia
Alexandru Zaharia, Romanian footballer
Alejandro Argudín-Zaharia, Romanian-Cuban athlete
Alin Zaharia, Romanian footballer
Dorel Zaharia, Romanian footballer
Dorin Liviu Zaharia, Romanian singer
Maria Zaharia, Romanian girl killed in World War I
Matei Zaharia, Romanian-Canadian computer scientist
Radu Zaharia, Romanian footballer

Notable people with this given name
Zaharia Bârsan, Romanian actor and playwright
Zaharia Carcalechi, Romanian publisher
Zaharia Stancu, Romanian writer

See also
 Zaharija, usual transliteration of the name from Serbian Cyrillic

Romanian masculine given names
Romanian-language surnames
Albanian-language surnames